Minoru Kawawada (born 16 January 1952) is a Japanese master of Shotokan karate.
He has won the JKA's version of the world championships for both kata and kumite, and has also won the JKA All-Japan Championships for kata on 2 occasions.
He is currently the Vice General Manager of the Japan Karate Association Technical Division, and an instructor at their headquarters dojo, as well as the famous Hoitsugan dojo founded by Masatoshi Nakayama.

Biography

Minoru Kawawada was born in Ibaraki Prefecture, Japan on 16 January 1952. He studied at Takushoku University. His karate training began during his 1st year of high school.

Competition
Minoru Kawawada has had considerable success in karate competition.

Major Tournament Success
30th JKA All Japan Karate Championship (1987)  - Tournament Grand Champion; 1st Place Kata; 3rd Place Kumite
29th JKA All Japan Karate Championship (1986) - 1st Place Kata
1st Shoto World Cup Karate Championship Tournament (Tokyo, 1985) - 1st Place Kumite; 1st Place Kata
28th JKA All Japan Karate Championship (1985) - 3rd Place Kumite

References

 

1952 births
Japanese male karateka
Karate coaches
Shotokan practitioners
Sportspeople from Ibaraki Prefecture
Takushoku University alumni
Living people
20th-century Japanese people